Belford railway station is a closed station on the Main North railway line. It served the settlement of Belford in the Hunter Region of New South Wales, Australia. Services were provided by CityRail's Hunter line until 4 September 2005, when the station was closed for safety reasons.

The station consisted of 2 platforms about 3 metres long. Until it was closed, the station contained safety features, including lighting and security cameras. Passengers would have to cross the tracks to access both platforms. There is no sign of the station now, which was near the level crossing of Hermitage Road. Nearby is the New England Highway which links Newcastle and Brisbane.

References

External links
Pictures of Belford station

Disused regional railway stations in New South Wales
Railway stations in the Hunter Region
Railway stations in Australia opened in 1869
Railway stations closed in 2005
Main North railway line, New South Wales